Yancy Victoria Butler (born July 2, 1970) is an American actress. She is known for her roles as Natasha Binder in the 1993 film Hard Target, Jess Crossman in Drop Zone, and Detective Sara Pezzini on the TNT supernatural drama series Witchblade.

Early life
Yancy Victoria Butler was born in Greenwich Village in Manhattan, the daughter of Leslie Vega, a theatre company manager, and Joe Butler, the drummer and vocalist for the 1960s rock group The Lovin' Spoonful.

Career
Butler's first major role was in the television series Mann & Machine in 1992, in which she played an android police officer partnered with a human detective. The series was set in Los Angeles in the near future. The series was co-created by Dick Wolf. A year later, she starred in her second series, South Beach, in which she played a con artist and thief who made a deal with the federal government; in exchange for their wiping of her criminal record, she performs certain tasks for them.

Butler's first film appearance was a small supporting role in the 1979 slasher film Savage Weekend. Her next film appearance was a starring role in John Woo's 1993 film, Hard Target. She then starred in the 1994 film Drop Zone. In 1995, she starred as Corinne the dancer in the film Let It Be Me. Butler was cast as a series regular in the CBS television series Brooklyn South playing Anne-Marie Kersey, a Brooklyn policewoman, which ran for one season from 1997 to 1998.

Butler starred in the television film Witchblade (2000) and the subsequent television series, adapted from the ongoing comic book of the same title; the series ran for two seasons on the Turner Network Television network for a total of 23 episodes. The series has a cult following, and was ranked seventh in the Top 10 Basic Cable Dramas for 2002. The show's cancellation was announced after the second season in September 2002.

In 2005, Butler starred in the film Bloodlines. For distribution purposes, it was retitled in 2006 as Striking Range. In 2007, she appeared in 13 episodes of the television soap opera As the World Turns, as Ava Jenkins. She was confirmed to appear in Tales of an Ancient Empire, the follow-up to The Sword and the Sorcerer. On January 24, 2012, Tales of an Ancient Empire was released on DVD. Butler, however, did not appear in the film. She appeared in a small role in another comic-book adaptation, the film version of Kick-Ass.

Legal issues
In November 2003, Butler was taken into custody in Delray Beach, Florida, for disorderly intoxication and sentenced to a substance-abuse treatment program. In 2007, Butler was charged with driving under the influence after she crashed her car. 

On April 3, 2017, Butler was arrested in Sag Harbor, New York, and charged with aggravated drunken driving and possession of drugs after she was found passed out behind the wheel of her car after it had hopped a curve onto the sidewalk.

Personal life
As of 2017, Butler lives in Winnetka, California.

Filmography

Film

Television

Awards
On June 10, 2002, Butler won a Saturn Award for Best Actress in a Television Series, at the 29th Annual Academy of Science Fiction, Fantasy & Horror Films Awards ceremony, for her performances in Witchblade.

References

External links

1970 births
Actresses from New York City
American child actresses
American film actresses
American television actresses
Living people
People from Greenwich Village
20th-century American actresses
21st-century American actresses